Hans Beißwenger (8 November 1916 – 6 March 1943) was a German Luftwaffe fighter ace and recipient of the Knight's Cross of the Iron Cross with Oak Leaves during World War II. A flying ace or fighter ace is a military aviator credited with shooting down five or more enemy aircraft during aerial combat. In 500 combat missions, Beißwenger was credited with 152 victories, making him the 34th highest-scoring Luftwaffe fighter pilot of World War II. He was "ace-in-a-day" twice, shooting down five aircraft on a single day. All but one of his victories were claimed over the Eastern Front. He was reported missing in action in March 1943.

Early life and career
Beißwenger was born on 8 November 1916 at Mittelfischach über Sulzbach in the district of Schwäbisch Hall in Württemberg. He was the son of Volksschule, a combined primary and lower secondary school, teacher. Following his graduation, he volunteered for military service in the Luftwaffe on 2 November 1937, initially serving with the Flak artillery. He was assigned to the 8th battery of Flak-Regiment 25 in Göppingen, where he received his basic military training. On 1 April 1938, he was posted to a Jagdfliegerschule for flight and fighter pilot training. In October 1940, more than one year after the start of World War II, Beißwenger was transferred to the II. Gruppe (2nd group) of Jagdgeschwader 54 (JG 54—54th Fighter Wing). He was promoted to Leutnant (second lieutenant) of the Reserves on 1 November 1940.

World War II
Assigned to 6. Staffel (6th squadron) of JG 54 based in France, Beißwenger's posting fell into a period of recuperation following the costly Battle of Britain. I. Gruppe had been the first to leave France and was sent to Jever on 27 September 1940. His II. Gruppe was moved to an airfield at Delmenhorst on 3 December 1940. On 29 March 1941, the Geschwaderstab (headquarters unit), II. And III. Gruppe were ordered to relocate to Austria in preparation of the Invasion of Yugoslavia. The Geschwaderstab and II. Gruppe were then both located at Graz.

The order for the invasion had been put forward in "Führer Directive No. 25", which Adolf Hitler issued on 27 March 1941, following the pro-British Yugoslav coup d'état in Belgrade. He claimed his first aerial victory on 7 April 1941, when he shot down a Yugoslav Royal Air Force Hawker Hurricane fighter. JG 54 continued flying ground support missions during the Balkans Campaign. Following the surrender of the Royal Yugoslav Army on 17 April 1941, while stationed at an airfield at Zemun near Belgrade, the Geschwader received orders on 3 May 1941 to turn over all Messerschmitt Bf 109-Es to Jagdgeschwader 77 (JG 77—77th Fighter Wing) so they could receive the new Bf 109-F variant. Transition training was completed at Airfield Stolp-Reitz in Pomerania.  Following the Balkans Campaign, Beißwenger was awarded the Iron Cross 2nd Class on 6 May 1941.

War against the Soviet Union
On the Eastern Front, serving with 3./JG 54 (3rd squadron), Beißwenger became a leading scorer in I./JG 54 (1st group). Although he was shot down on 17 July 1941 behind enemy lines, he escaped capture and returned to his base. He claimed his 20th aerial victory over an I-18 fighter on 24 August 1941. By the end of 1941, his total stood at 32 aerial victories. He claimed his 40th victory on 6 April 1942, on 8 May, he achieved his 50th victory, and the following day, he received the Knight's Cross of the Iron Cross on 9 May 1942 for 50 victories claimed. Beißwenger and Leutnant Horst Hannig received the Knight's Cross from General der Flieger Helmuth Förster at Siverskaya. On 11 August 1942, Beißwenger was appointed Staffelkapitän of 6./JG 54.

On 15 August 1942, he claimed his 75th aerial victory and his 100th on 26 September, for which he was awarded the Knight's Cross of the Iron Cross with Oak Leaves on 30 September. He was the 25th Luftwaffe pilot to achieve the century mark. He became "ace-in-a-day" on 23 August during three combat missions, when for the first time he achieved five aerial victories in one day. On 4 September 1942, Hauptmann Dietrich Hrabak, his group commander, filed an officer efficiency report requesting a preferential promotion to Oberleutnant (First Lieutenant). The report highlighted that he "has excelled in action as a fighter pilot" and that "during 449 combat flights, he has 97 kills because of his audacity". The report further described Beißwenger as having "good leadership talent" and being "positive as a National Socialist". His promotion was approved and, after a short vacation, Beißwenger returned to combat duty and by the end of 1942, his victory total stood at 119. He claimed his 125th aerial victory on 23 January 1943, 135th by 11 February 1943 and five more on 5 March 1943 (146th – 150th aerial victories)

He did not return to base after an air combat south of Lake Ilmen near Staraja Russa on 6 March 1943 and Oberleutnant Hans Beißwenger, flying Messerschmitt Bf 109 G-2 (Werknummer 14236—factory number) "yellow 4", was posted as missing. His Schwarm had been engaged in a combat with four Soviet fighters. Beißwenger claimed his last two victories, numbers 151 and 152, over Lavochkin LaGG-3 fighters that day. The Messerschmitt Bf 109 of Unteroffizier Georg Munderloh was damaged in a midair collision, and Munderloh reported that he would try to reach his base. Eventually, he had to land in enemy territory. Taken prisoner, he was later told by Soviet pilots involved in the action that they had shot down another German fighter, which could have been Beißwenger. Another German pilot observed Beißwenger's aircraft flying at low altitude, clearly suffering from engine problems, attempting to return to friendly territory. After that, there was no trace of him. Beißwenger was later listed as missing in action. It may be that Beißwenger was brought down by Starshiy Leytenant Ivan Kholodov of 32 GvIAP (Guards Fighter Aviation Regiment—Gvardeyskiy Istrebitelny Aviatsionny Polk). Kholodov rammed the Bf 109—probably Beißwenger's—that was attacking his wingman, Leytenant Arkadiy Makarov, and managed to bail out of his own damaged craft before it crashed.

Summary of career

Aerial victory claims
According to US historian David T. Zabecki, Beißwenger was credited with 152 aerial victories. Obermaier also lists Beißwenger with shooting down 152 enemy aircraft, all but one on the Eastern Front. In addition, he claimed the destruction of one tethered balloon. He flew over 500 combat missions during his career. Mathews and Foreman, authors of Luftwaffe Aces – Biographies and Victory Claims, researched the German Federal Archives and found records for 150 aerial victory claims. This number includes one claim during the Balkans Campaign and 149 on the Eastern Front.

Victory claims were logged to a map-reference (PQ = Planquadrat), for example "PQ 18262". These sectors were then subdivided into 36 smaller units to give a location area 3x4km in size.

Awards
 Iron Cross (1939)
 2nd class (6 May 1941)
 1st class (16 August 1941)
 Honour Goblet of the Luftwaffe (Ehrenpokal der Luftwaffe) (9 August 1941)
 Front Flying Clasp of the Luftwaffe for Fighter Pilots in Gold (20 August 1941)
 German Cross in Gold on 17 October 1941 as Leutnant of the Reserves in the 6./Jagdgeschwader 54
 Knight's Cross of the Iron Cross with Oak Leaves
 Knight's Cross on 9 May 1942 as Leutnant and pilot in the 6./Jagdgeschwader 54
 130th Oak Leaves on 30 September 1942 as Leutnant and pilot in the 6./Jagdgeschwader 54

See also
List of people who disappeared

Notes

References

Citations

Bibliography

 
 
 
 
 
 
 
 
 
 
 
 
 
 
 
 
 
 
 
 
 

1916 births
1940s missing person cases
1943 deaths
Aerial disappearances of military personnel in action
Luftwaffe personnel killed in World War II
German World War II flying aces
Luftwaffe pilots
Missing in action of World War II
Pilots who performed an aerial ramming
People from Schwäbisch Hall
Recipients of the Gold German Cross
Recipients of the Knight's Cross of the Iron Cross with Oak Leaves
Military personnel from Baden-Württemberg